Admiral Drury may refer to:

Byron Drury (1815–1888), British Royal Navy vice admiral
William O'Bryen Drury (1754–1811), British Royal Navy vice admiral

See also
Sidney Robert Drury-Lowe (1871–1945), British Royal Navy vice admiral